A. exigua may refer to:

 Acaena exigua, a rose endemic to Hawaii
 Acrolophus exigua, a South American moth
 Acrotona exigua, a rove beetle
 Aglaia exigua, a New Guinean mahogany
 Agrostis exigua, a North American bunchgrass
 Agyneta exigua, an African spider
 Alcadia exigua, a land snail
 Alcyna exigua, a sea snail
 Aleuria exigua, a cup fungus
 Anaxipha exigua, a sword-tail cricket
 Ancilla exigua, a sea snail
 Andrena exigua, a nonparasitic bee
 Antoniettella exigua, a colonial invertebrate
 Anxietas exigua, a sea snail
 Asterias exigua, a starfish native to the northeastern Atlantic Ocean and the Mediterranean Sea
 Attalea exigua, a New World palm